Rous Head is a reclaimed seabed area, which is utilised as a service industrial area. It includes a small harbour area that is located on the north side of the North Mole at Fremantle Harbour.

It has a Rottnest Island ferry service jetty located in Rous Head Harbour, and a boat maintenance area in the harbour.

Original
The original Rous Head was a feature on the coastline before the changes at the harbour area.

In the 1860s, the head was the natural point of reference to the bar and rock that blocked the river for any possible usage as a harbour.

Land fill
Various schemes and plans were put forward before the current plan was adopted.

It currently has a network of roads, Port Beach Road being the main access road, with it extending into Rudderhan Drive, and Rous Head Road to the Rous Head Harbour and Ferry Terminal. 

North Mole road goes all the way to the North Mole Lighthouse, leaves Rudderham and travels on the breakwater between the ocean and the Rous Head Harbour to the north mole.

References

Fremantle Harbour